Sally Morgan  may refer to:
 Sally Morgan (artist) (born 1951), Australian Aboriginal author, scriptwriter and artist
 Sally Morgan, Baroness Morgan of Huyton (born 1959), British politician
 Sally Morgan (psychic), British celebrity psychic